Sally Gregory Kohlstedt (born 1943) is an American historian of science. She is a professor in the Department of Earth Sciences and in the Program in History of Science and Technology at the University of Minnesota.  Kohlstedt served as the president of the History of Science Society from 1992 to 1993. Her research interests focus on the history of science in American culture and the demographics of scientific practice in institutions such as museums and educational institutions, including gender participation.

Early life and education
Kohlstedt received her B. A. from Valparaiso University (1965), her M. A. from Michigan State University (1966) and her Ph.D. from the University of Illinois at Urbana–Champaign (1972).

Career
Kohlstedt was an assistant professor in the Department of History at Simmons College from 1971 to 1975. She was promoted to a full professor in the Department of History at Syracuse University in 1975, where she worked until 1989. Since 1989, she has been a professor at the University of Minnesota (UMN). From 1989 to 1995, she was the Associate Dean for Academic Affairs at the College of Science and Engineering at UMN; from 1997 to 1999, she served as the director of the Center for Advanced Feminist Studies at UMN; from 2004-2006, Interim Chair of the Department of Anthropology at UMN; and from 2008 to 2013, the director of the Program in History of Science and Technology. Her leadership and work as a teacher and mentor of women faculty and students has been described as "nothing short of heroic". She has also held visiting appointments at Cornell (1989), the University of Melbourne (1983), the University of Munich (1997), and the University of Auckland (2008), and the Max Planck Institute for the History of Science in Berlin (2015).

Kohlstedt studies relationships between science and culture. She is particularly interested in the history of women in science, including both obstacles and successes to the pursuit of equity, and examines the effects of women's participation and their impact on scientific practice. She is particularly interested in women's involvement in areas such as museums and educational practice. Kohlstedt received the 2013 History of Science Society's Margaret Rossiter Prize for the Best Book on Women's History for Teaching Children Science: Hands-On Nature Study in North America, 1890-1930 (University of Chicago Press, 2010). The book examines the work of women in bringing natural science education into the American classroom and demonstrates that it was innovative women teachers who introduced science into the public schools in the early twentieth century.

Kohlstedt is a life member of the History of Science Society (HSS) and has been actively involved in a variety of roles including Secretary, 1978-1981; Council, 1982-1984, 
1989-1991, and 1994-1995; Vice-President, 1990 and 1991 and President, 1992 and 1993, among others.  She has been particularly active in the Women's Caucus of the HSS. She has also served on the board of directors of the American Association for the Advancement of Science (AAAS).

Partial bibliography

Awards
 2018, Sarton Medal for lifetime scholarly achievement from the History of Science Society
2015, Joseph H. Hazen Education Prize for excellence in education from the History of Science Society
 2014, President's Award from the Council of Graduate Students, University of Minnesota
 2013, Margaret W. Rossiter History of Women in Science Prize for the Best Book on Women's History, from the History of Science Society
 2011, Ada Comstock Distinguished Women Scholars Lecture and Award, University of Minnesota
 2008, Senior Fulbright Fellow/Visiting Professor at the University of Auckland
 2004, President's Award for Outstanding University Service, University of Minnesota
 2002, Mullen/Spector/Truax Women's Leadership Award, University of Minnesota
 2000, George Taylor Distinguished Service Award, Institute of Technology, University of Minnesota
 1983, Senior Fulbright Fellow at the South Australian Museum, The Queensland Museum, and the National Museum of Victoria

References

External links

1943 births
Living people
Historians of science
University of Minnesota faculty
Valparaiso University alumni
Michigan State University alumni
University of Illinois Urbana-Champaign alumni
Women historians
American women scientists
American women academics
21st-century American women